Chandril Sood (born 20 February 1991) is an Indian tennis player.

Sood has a career high ATP singles ranking of 908 achieved on 21 December 2015. He also has a career high ATP doubles ranking of 282 achieved on 13 November 2017.

Sood made his ATP main draw debut at the 2015 Aircel Chennai Open in the doubles draw partnering his twin brother Lakshit Sood. Till date Sood has won 11 doubles titles of ITF Men’s futures in years 2015, 2016 and 2017 (2015 : 4, 2016 : 3 & 2017 : 4).

Sood has also represented INDIA at World University Games held at Gwangju, South Korea in the year 2015.

External links

1991 births
Living people
Indian male tennis players
Sportspeople from Ludhiana